Jefferson Antonio Montero Vite (born 1 September 1989) is an Ecuadorian professional footballer who plays as a winger for Ecuadorian Serie A club S.D. Aucas. He has represented the Ecuador national team at senior international level.

Club career

Early years
Born in Babahoyo, Los Ríos Province, Montero started playing professionally with Emelec, but first impressed whilst at Independiente José Teran in the Ecuadorian Serie B.

Shortly after arriving he was loaned to Mexican club Dorados de Sinaloa, which was pushing for promotion to the Liga MX. He signed alongside compatriot José Madrid, and made his official debut for his new team on 11 October 2008 by playing the entire match against Irapuato.

Villarreal

On 27 April 2009, La Liga club Villarreal signed the 20-year-old Montero to a five-year contract effective from July. He contributed two goals and five assists as the Valencians trounced amateurs Navata 27–0 in a pre-season friendly. He made his competitive debut for the senior side in the Europa League round of 32 in February 2010, replacing Robert Pires with 20 minutes left as Villarreal were eliminated by Wolfsburg, but spent the vast majority of his first season with the reserves as one of their most important attacking elements as they overachieved to finish seventh in their first season in the Segunda División.

Subsequently, Montero was promoted to the main squad as a complement for the more experienced Santi Cazorla and Cani. He made his top-flight debut in the opening fixture of the 2010–11 La Liga season, replacing Cani in a 0–1 loss at Real Sociedad.

Montero failed to find a regular first-team place at Villarreal, and moved to another La Liga club, Levante, in late January 2011 on loan for the rest of the season. He spent the following season on loan at another top-flight club, the newly promoted Real Betis. He scored his first goal of the campaign on 10 March 2012 in a 2–3 home defeat against Real Madrid. He was first choice throughout most of his tenure with the Pepe Mel-led squad, who managed to retain their league status.

Morelia
On 15 June 2012, Montero was transferred to Monarcas Morelia of the Mexican top flight, on a three-year deal. He scored his first goal on 15 July against Club América, as well as making two assists. On 21 August, in the Copa MX contest against his former team Dorados, he scored a hat-trick in a 6–0 win.

On 4 January 2013, Montero scored the opening goal of the Clausura, in a 3–3 home draw against Cruz Azul, assisted by international team-mate Joao Rojas. After Rojas left Morelia, Montero was given the number 10 shirt, starting off the new campaign on 19 July with a goal and two assists in a 3–1 victory over Querétaro. His hat-trick the following weekend was in vain, as Morelia lost 4–3 at home to Toluca. He scored the opening goal in the Apertura 2013 Copa MX Final in which Morelia beat Atlas on penalties after the match finished as a 3–3 draw.

Swansea City
On 24 July 2014, Montero signed for Premier League team Swansea City on a four-year contract for an undisclosed fee. He made his competitive debut on 16 August in the opening game of the season at Old Trafford, replacing Nathan Dyer after 67 minutes of a 2–1 win over Manchester United.

Montero joined Spanish top-division club Getafe on 1 September 2017 on loan for the season. In his first match of the 2017–18 La Liga campaign 20 days later, he played for 15 minutes in a 1–1 away draw with Celta. Having featured little for Getafe, Montero rejoined Emelec in late February 2018 where he completed his loan. On 2 June, he scored in the 3–0 victory against Técnico Universitario at Estadio George Capwell, 11 years after his last goal for the club. In his post-match interview he said he was "very happy for today's victory and for scoring for my team after so many years, forever grateful to God".

Montero made 13 substitute appearances for Swansea before joining 2018–19 Championship rivals West Bromwich Albion on 31 January 2019 on loan for the rest of the season. He played just four times and started once, away to Queens Park Rangers on 19 February, opening the scoring in a 3–2 win.

After a delay while issues with the paperwork were resolved, Montero was confirmed to have joined Championship club Birmingham City on loan for the 2019–20 season. He made his debut on 20 August as a late substitute in the 2–0 win over Barnsley, and produced a "sparkling ten minute cameo" that earned him 7 out of 10 in the Birmingham Mail player ratings. He started the next match, but suffered a thigh injury that kept him out for a couple of months. By the time the season was suspended because of the COVID-19 pandemic, he had made 18 appearances in all competitions but only 2 league starts, and Birmingham chose not to attempt to extend his loan to the end of the campaign. He was released by Swansea when his contract expired on 30 June.

On 20 November 2020, Montero returned to Mexico to join Liga MX side Querétaro.

International career

Montero represented Ecuador at the 2007 Pan American Games, and scored in the final match against Jamaica, a 2–1 win which brought the first international trophy in Ecuadorian football history. He received his first senior call-up from coach Luis Fernando Suárez for an August 2007 friendly with Bolivia.

Montero made his senior debut for Ecuador on 21 November 2007 in a 2010 FIFA World Cup qualifier at home to Peru, coming on late in the second half in a 5–1 win. He scored his first goal for the national team on 27 May 2009, in a 1–3 friendly loss to El Salvador, and his second came in the reverse fixture with Peru in Lima, which Ecuador won 2–1.

Montero was selected by national coach Reinaldo Rueda for his 2014 World Cup squad. He made his debut in the tournament on 15 June in a 1–2 group stage loss against Switzerland; he started and played 77 minutes.

Career statistics

Club

International

International goals
Scores and results list Ecuador's goal tally first.

Honours

Club
Morelia
Copa MX: Apertura 2013

Country
Ecuador U20
Pan American Games: 2007

References

External links

1989 births
Living people
People from Babahoyo
Ecuadorian footballers
Ecuador international footballers
Association football wingers
Ecuadorian Serie A players
C.S. Emelec footballers
C.S.D. Independiente del Valle footballers
Liga MX players
Dorados de Sinaloa footballers
Atlético Morelia players
Querétaro F.C. footballers
La Liga players
Segunda División players
Villarreal CF B players
Villarreal CF players
Levante UD footballers
Real Betis players
Getafe CF footballers
Premier League players
English Football League players
Swansea City A.F.C. players
West Bromwich Albion F.C. players
Birmingham City F.C. players
2014 FIFA World Cup players
2015 Copa América players
Copa América Centenario players
Pan American Games competitors for Ecuador
Footballers at the 2007 Pan American Games
Ecuadorian expatriate footballers
Expatriate footballers in Mexico
Expatriate footballers in Spain
Expatriate footballers in Wales
Ecuadorian expatriate sportspeople in Mexico
Ecuadorian expatriate sportspeople in Spain
Ecuadorian expatriate sportspeople in Wales
Medalists at the 2007 Pan American Games
Pan American Games gold medalists for Ecuador
Pan American Games medalists in football
21st-century Ecuadorian people
Ecuadorian expatriate sportspeople in England
Expatriate footballers in England